Pingliang is a prefecture-level city in eastern Gansu province, China, bordering Shaanxi province to the south and east and the Ningxia Hui Autonomous Region to the north. The city was established in 376 AD. It has a residential population of 2,125,300 in 2019. The urban population is almost 900,000.

Pingliang is well known for the nearby Kongtong Mountains, which are sacred to Taoism and location of the mythical meeting place of the Yellow Emperor and Guangchengzi, an immortal.

List of divisions

Geography 
Pingliang ranges in latitude from 34° 54' to 35° 46' N and in longitude from 105° 20' to 107° 51' E. Bordering prefecture-level cities are Xianyang (Shaanxi) to the east, Baoji (Shaanxi) and Tianshui to the south, Dingxi and Baiyin to the west, and Guyuan (Ningxia) and Qingyang to the north.

With monthly percent possible sunshine ranging from 46% in September to 65% in December, the city receives 2,381 hours of bright sunshine annually.

Transport 
G22 Qingdao–Lanzhou Expressway, which motorists can take to reach the south of neighbouring Ningxia and eventually Lanzhou, the capital of Gansu
China National Highway 312, which motorists can take to reach Xi'an

Notable residents
Zhao Jiping, film composer (b. 1945)

Notable births 
Pingliang is the birthplace of Huangfu Mi, who wrote the first book on acupuncture, of Niu Sengru, and of Southern Song dynasty generals Wu Jie (吴玠) and Wu Lin.

References

External links
Official Site

 
Prefecture-level divisions of Gansu